Francisco Narcizio Abreu de Lima (born July 18, 1971) is a former Brazilian football player.

Club statistics

References

External links

1971 births
Living people
Brazilian footballers
Brazilian expatriate footballers
Expatriate footballers in Japan
Association football forwards
Campeonato Brasileiro Série A players
Campeonato Brasileiro Série B players
J1 League players
Ceará Sporting Club players
Yverdon-Sport FC players
Ferroviário Atlético Clube (CE) players
Botafogo de Futebol e Regatas players
Cerezo Osaka players
Esporte Clube Vitória players
Sport Club Internacional players
Rio Branco Esporte Clube players
Associação Atlética Ponte Preta players
Ituano FC players
Paraná Clube players
América Futebol Clube (MG) players
Avaí FC players